Angleworm Lake is an unorganized territory in Saint Louis County, Minnesota, United States. As of the 2000 census, the unorganized territory had a total population of 0.

Geography 
According to the United States Census Bureau, the unorganized territory has a total area of 31.4 square miles (81.3 km2), of which 28.0 square miles (72.4 km2) is land and 3.4 square miles (8.9 km2) (10.93%) is water.

Demographics 
As of the census of 2000, there were no people living in the unorganized territory.

References

Populated places in St. Louis County, Minnesota
Unorganized territories in Minnesota